James "Jay" Bell (born 24 November 1989) is an English footballer who  last played for Marine. He also previously played for Accrington Stanley for three years and made his Football League debut on 26 April 2008 in a 3–1 win over Wrexham. In August 2009, he joined Welsh Premier League side Bala Town, making three appearances before moving to Marine.

References

External links

Welsh Premier profile

Footballers from Liverpool
English footballers
Association football defenders
Accrington Stanley F.C. players
Prescot Cables F.C. players
Burscough F.C. players
Bala Town F.C. players
Marine F.C. players
English Football League players
Cymru Premier players
Living people
1989 births